The Boundary Waters Treaty is the 1909 treaty between the United States and Canada providing mechanisms for resolving any dispute over any waters bordering the two countries. The treaty covers the

Canada, as a dominion of the Crown of Britain at the time, subsequently enacted the International Boundary Waters Treaty Act to implement the treaty.

History
Momentum for a boundary waters treaty built up against a background of difficulties encountered in apportioning the waters of the St. Mary and Milk Rivers in the west, the Rainy River, the Chicago Diversion of Lake Michigan (which at the time lowered lake levels by 6 inches), the St. Mary's River at Sault Ste. Marie, and the Niagara River. Thus at the International Irrigation Congresses in Denver, Colorado, in 1894 and in Albuquerque, New Mexico, in 1895, resolutions were introduced by the Canadian delegate and adopted unanimously by the American, Mexican, and Canadian delegations.  The resolution recommended to the United States "the appointment of an international commission to act in conjunction with the authorities of Mexico and Canada in adjudicating the conflicting rights which have arisen, or may hereafter arise, on streams of an international character."  In 1896, the Canadian Government requested that the British Ambassador at Washington inform the American Government that it was prepared to cooperate "by appointment of an international commission or otherwise" in the regulation of international streams for irrigation purposes.

The Boundary Waters Treaty, completed on January 11, 1909, was approved for ratification by a supermajority (two-thirds) of the American Senate on March 3, 1909. American President William Taft ratified the treaty on May 13, 1910. British King Edward VII ratified Canada's corollary International Boundary Waters Treaty Act.

Objectives
The Treaty's framework prevents and resolves disputes over boundary waters. It defines boundary waters as surface waters along the international border, mostly in whole, excluding upstream tributaries (Preliminary Article). It establishes free use of boundary waters for commerce and navigation forever (Article I). It grants respective federal and state/provincial governments legal jurisdiction over the use, obstruction, and diversion of these waters (Article II). It creates the International Joint Commission (IJC) and requires future hydromodifications be approved by a majority of the three Canadian and three American Commissioners (Articles III, IV, VII, VIII). The IJC can only provide research or orders of approval if either federal government submits a referral (Article IX).

Effect on water resources
The IJC has jurisdiction for regulating water quantity, including flows and levels, the Treaty enumerates the following order of precedence of use (Article VIII):
 Domestic and sanitary use,
 Navigation, and
 Power and irrigation.
The Treaty applies the riparian doctrine that one use cannot materially impair another protected use. Therefore, many issues of water quality are also within the IJC's purview.

See also
 Boundary Waters
 International Joint Commission
 Great Lakes–Saint Lawrence River Basin Sustainable Water Resources Agreement

External links
 International Joint Commission website - English
 International Joint Commission website - French

References

United Kingdom–United States treaties
1909 in Canada
1909 in the United States
1909 in the environment
Boundary treaties
Treaties concluded in 1909
Canada–United States border
Water treaties
Treaties of the United Kingdom (1801–1922)
Treaties extended to Canada